Ernest V. "Ernie" Ritchie (born c. 1898) was a rugby union player who represented Australia.

Ritchie, a prop, was born in Sydney and claimed a total of 4 international rugby caps for Australia.

References

Australian rugby union players
Australia international rugby union players
Rugby union players from Sydney
Rugby union props